WRJZ (620 AM) is a Christian talk radio station in Knoxville, TN that broadcasts with 5,000 watts in a non-directional daytime pattern and a five-lobed night-time directional pattern. It is owned by Tennessee Media Associates.

Programming
Bob Bell hosts the morning show.

Among the syndicated programs airing on Joy 620 are Focus on the Family, Chuck Swindoll's Insight for Living, In Touch with Charles Stanley, and other Christian teaching programs.

WRJZ also airs Carson-Newman College and Grace Christian Academy football games.

History
WRJZ is one of Knoxville's oldest radio stations. It signed on in 1927 as WNBJ, owned by Lonsdale Baptist Church and operating on 1450 AM. It moved to 1310 AM in 1930 under new owner Stewart Broadcasting Corporation. A year later, Stuart changed the calls to WROL. It moved to its current frequency in 1941. 

The station's ownership group was part of a consortium that signed on Knoxville's first television station, WROL-TV, in 1953 on channel 6. Two years later, the call sign was changed to WATE AM-TV.

The two stations went their separate ways in 1971, with the television station retaining the WATE-TV calls while the radio station changed its calls to WETE. The station aired an adult contemporary format during for most of the 1960s and 1970s. In 1976, WETE-AM changed the call letters to WRJZ-AM, and began airing a top 40 format. 

CP and Walker, Jeff Jarnigan, Adele (see below), Mark Thompson, Rick Kirk, John Boy, and J.J. Scott were some of the station's best-known personalities throughout the 1970s.

Adele Arakawa, the first female DJ in Knoxville, worked at WRJZ broadcasting Top 40  music for 5 years in the late 1970s.

Other DJs from WRJZ's late 1970s Top 40 era who became well-known were "John Boy" Isley, later of the "John-Boy and Billy Big Show" in Charlotte, NC. and Mark Thompson, later of "Mark and Brian", the FM drive team who have been on 95.5 KLOS for 20-plus years.

After several years as a popular Top 40 station but losing market share to FM station WOKI, WRJZ briefly switched to an adult contemporary format in 1981, then shortly thereafter to a country music format, then an oldies format, then shortly thereafter went dark entirely only to return to the air during the 1980s with a Christian talk format under the new slogan "Joy 62".

References

External links
Station web site

RJZ
RJZ